Sahar El Mougy is an Egyptian novelist and academic. She teaches English Literature and American Studies at Cairo University. She has published several novels and short story collections. Her most celebrated work, Noon, published in 2007, won the Cavafis Award. 

She has served as a judge for the Arabic Booker Prize.

References

21st-century Egyptian women writers
Year of birth missing (living people)
Living people
Place of birth missing (living people)
Academic staff of Cairo University
Egyptian academics
Egyptian women novelists